Jaster is a surname. It may refer to:

Dana Jaster, American Paralympic athlete
Larry Jaster (born 1944), American baseball pitcher
Lisa Jaster (born 1978), American soldier and engineer
Natalia Jaster, American author of young adult fiction

See also
 

Surnames